</noinclude>

This is the list of episodes for The Late Late Show with James Corden in 2015.

2015

March

April

May

June

July

August

September

October

November

December
</onlyinclude>

References

External links
 James Corden on Twitter
 The Late Late Show with James Corden at CBS
 The Late Late Show with James Corden on Twitter
 The Late Late Show with James Corden on Facebook
 

 
2015-related lists